Lodrisio Visconti (c. 1280 – 1364) was an Italian condottiero.

Biography
He was the son of Pietro, of the powerful Visconti of Milan, and Antiochia Crivelli.

After military training under his father, he helped his cousin Matteo Visconti and the latter's son Galeazzo in the reconquest of Milan against the Torriani.  Later, together with another cousin, Marco, he was instrumental in the imprisonment of Galeazzo and his son Azzone at Monza. When the two were freed, Lodrisio fled to his territory of Seprio.

Azzone besieged him and destroyed his castle, but Lodrisio was able to escape to Vicenza, being hired by Mastino II della Scala, lord of Verona. In 1339 he mustered a large army, mostly from Switzerland, with 2,500 cavalry and 1000 infantry, baptized Compagnia di San Giorgio ("Company of St. George"). It was the first organized compagnia of mercenaries led by an Italian condottiero.

After invading the territory of Milan, Lodrisio's army was defeated in early February at the Battle of Parabiago. He was captured and, together with his son Ambrogio, imprisoned within an iron cage in the castle of San Colombano. Here he remained for ten years, when he was freed by the new Milanese lord, archbishop Giovanni Visconti. The latter's nephew Galeazzo II appointed him as commander of the troops in the reconquest of Piedmont, during which he distinguished himself in the great victory in 1356 against the anti-Visconti league, who had hired the mercenary Grand Company of Konrad von Landau.

He lived at the court of Galeazzo until his death in 1364.

References

Sources

1280 births
1364 deaths
14th-century condottieri
Lodrisio